Future Meat Technologies, or Future Meat for short, is a biotechnology firm which produces cultured meat from chicken cells and is working on cultured lamb kebabs and beef burgers. Based in Israel, its main office is located in Jerusalem, while its primary production facility is operating in Rehovot. Future Meat Technologies mainly seeks to supply hardware and cell lines to manufacturers of cultured meat rather than directly selling food products to consumers.

History 
Future Meat Technologies was founded in 2018 by Yaakov Nahmias, a biomedical engineering professor of the Hebrew University of Jerusalem. He became Future Meat's chief scientific officer. 

The company presented its cultured meat prototype to the public in 2019. In October 2019, it raised $14 million to build its pilot plant, and estimated that it could bring its products to the market in 2022. To achieve this, Future Meat stated in February 2020 that it sought to bring down the price of producing cultured meat to $10 per pound by 2022.

In January 2020, Quartz found around 30 cultured meat startups, and that Memphis Meats, Just Inc. and Future Meat Technologies were the most advanced because they were building pilot plants.

In June 2021, the construction of Future Meat's pilot plant in Rehovot was completed, and it entered into service. As of November 2021, the facility was capable of producing 500 kilograms of cultured meat per day, or 182,625 kilograms a year. That year it raised a Series B investment round of US$347M.

Technology 
The company extracts cells from live animals. It cultures those cells in stainless steel fermenters, where they reproduce and develop into edible tissues. The company claims that reproduction rates are 10x greater than others, while generating 20% of their greenhouse gas emissions. Compared to animal husbandry, it uses 1% of the land and 4% of the water. In 2021, it reduced the cost of a cultured  chicken breast from US$7.50 to $1.70.

References

External links
 

Biotechnology companies of Israel
Cellular agriculture
Food and drink companies of Israel